Elena Timina (born 8 May 1969) is a Russian-born Dutch professional table tennis player. She was born in Moscow, Soviet Union.

Career highlights

Summer Olympic Games
1992, Barcelona, women's singles, 1st round
1992, Barcelona, women's doubles, quarter final
1996, Atlanta, women's singles, 1st round
1996, Atlanta, women's doubles, quarter final
2012, London, women's team, quarter final
World Championships
1989, Dortmund, women's doubles, last 16
1993, Gothenburg, team competition, 5th
1995, Tianjin, women's doubles, quarter final
1995, Tianjin, team competition, 9th
1997, Manchester, women's doubles, last 16
1997, Manchester, team competition, 9th
World Team Cup
1990, Hokkaidō, 5th
1991, Barcelona, 9th
1994, Nîmes, 1st 
1995, Atlanta, 5th
World Doubles Cup:
1992, Las Vegas, women's doubles, quarter final
Pro Tour Meetings
1996, Kettering, women's singles, semi final
1996, Kettering, women's doubles, quarter final
1996, Bolzano, women's doubles, quarter final
1998, Doha, women's doubles, semi final
1998, Zagreb, women's doubles, quarter final
2007, Velenje, women's doubles, semi final
European Championships
1990, Gothenburg, women's singles, last 16
1990, Gothenburg, women's doubles, runner-up 
1992, Stuttgart, women's singles, last 16
1992, Stuttgart, women's doubles, semi final
1994, Birmingham, women's singles, last 16
1994, Birmingham, women's doubles, runner-up 
1994, Birmingham, team competition, 1st 
1996, Bratislava, women's singles, last 16
1998, Eindhoven, women's singles, last 16
2008 – 2011, European Champion team tournament
European Youth Championships
1983, Malmö, women's doubles, runner up  (cadet)
1986, Louvin La Neuve, women's singles, semi final (juniors)
European Top-12 Championships
1992, Vienna, 5th
1993, Copenhagen, 9th
1994, Arezzo, 11th
1995, Dijon, 9th
1996, Charleroi, 11th
1997, Eindhoven, 9th

References

External links
 
 
 
 
 

Dutch female table tennis players
Russian female table tennis players
Sportspeople from Moscow
Soviet table tennis players
Living people
1969 births
Olympic table tennis players of the Unified Team
Olympic table tennis players of Russia
Olympic table tennis players of the Netherlands
Table tennis players at the 1992 Summer Olympics
Table tennis players at the 1996 Summer Olympics
Table tennis players at the 2008 Summer Olympics
Table tennis players at the 2012 Summer Olympics
Russian emigrants to the Netherlands